Acrocercops soritis is a moth of the family Gracillariidae. It is known from Ecuador.

References

soritis
Gracillariidae of South America
Moths described in 1915